He Jin (died 22 September 189), courtesy name Suigao, was a Chinese military general and politician. He was the military Grand Marshal and regent of the late Eastern Han dynasty of China. He was an elder half-brother of Empress He, the empress consort of Emperor Ling, and a maternal uncle of Emperor Shao. In 189, he and his sister shared power as regents when the young Emperor Shao was put on the throne following Emperor Ling's death. During the time, the conflict between He Jin and the influential eunuch faction intensified. The eunuch faction lured He Jin into a trap in the imperial palace and assassinated him. While He Jin's subordinates slaughtered the eunuch faction in revenge, the warlord Dong Zhuo took advantage of the power vacuum to enter the imperial capital Luoyang and seize control of the Han central government. The subsequent breakdown of central command brought forth the beginning of massive civil wars which led to the end of the Han dynasty and the start of the Three Kingdoms period.

Life
He Jin was born into a family of butchers in Nanyang, hometown of the dynastic founder Emperor Guangwu. During the reign of Emperor Ling, his younger half-sister entered the palace and soon became one of the emperor's favourites. In January 181, she was made empress and He Jin henceforth began a speedy escalation up the bureaucratic ladder.

When the Yellow Turban Rebellion erupted in 184, He Jin was appointed General-in-Chief. He commanded the imperial armory, secured strategic forts around the capital and moved quickly to crush the uprising at Luoyang led by Ma Yuanyi, a follower of the rebel leader, Zhang Jue. The campaign was deemed a success and He Jin was enfeoffed as the Marquis of Shen. After the rebellion was quelled, He Jin continued in the role of General-in-Chief, technically in control of all the imperial armies. During this time, other members of his family, such as his younger step-brother He Miao, were also elevated to positions of importance.

In 188, perhaps as a counterweight to the power of the He family, Emperor Ling created the Army of the Western Garden. The emperor ostentatiously paraded in front of the army and had himself named "Supreme General". The emperor also had the army placed under the command of Jian Shuo, a trusted eunuch. By commanding the Army of the Western Garden, the emperor could put He Jin under his own command.

When Emperor Ling died in the early months of 189, the stage was set for a showdown between He Jin and the eunuch faction. Jian Shuo plotted to lure He Jin into a trap at the imperial palace where he would be assassinated. However, when He Jin arrived, a minor official Pan Yin subtly warned He Jin about Jian Shuo's plot. Astonished, He Jin returned to his own camp and evaded the assassination attempt. Afterwards, He Jin had Jian Shuo arrested, executed, and then seized command of the troops previously under Jian Shuo's command.

With the support of the elite Yuan family, particularly Yuan Shao and Yuan Shu, the succession dispute was resolved in favour of Liu Bian, the son of Empress He, who ascended the throne in the fifth month of that year. He Jin and his sister, now the Empress Dowager, jointly took on the role of regent.

During the summer months, He Jin and his subordinates engaged the eunuch faction in court politics. The eunuchs, now without a military power base of their own, relied on the support of Empress Dowager He and He Miao. At the urging of Yuan Shao, He Jin summoned the general Dong Zhuo to the outskirts of Luoyang, in an attempt to force the Empress Dowager to back down. In the ninth month of that year, He Jin entered the palace to request the Empress Dowager agree to the execution of the eunuchs. Zhang Rang, the leader of the eunuch faction, discovered He Jin's plan through a spy who overheard the conversation between He Jin and the Empress Dowager. The eunuchs then lured He Jin into the imperial palace by summoning him in the name of the Empress Dowager. He Jin entered the palace unsuspectingly, without his escort, and met his end at the hands of the eunuchs.

The situation soon spun out of control. Yuan Shao and Yuan Shu, both with significant control of military forces within the capital, stormed the palace and massacred the eunuchs. The resulting power vacuum allowed Dong Zhuo to seize control of the imperial court. As soon as he held supremacy over the capital, Dong Zhuo deposed the emperor in favour of the Prince of Chenliu, who came to be known as Emperor Xian. The deposition as well as Dong Zhuo's subsequent atrocities incurred the wrath of many. In 190, warlords from the eastern provinces formed a coalition to oust Dong Zhuo, which kicked off a series of civil wars that were to last for nearly a century.

Family
He Jin had at least two half-siblings and a step-brother:
 Empress He, the empress consort of Emperor Ling and mother of Emperor Shao
 Lady He, full sister of Empress He, who married the adopted son of the eunuch Zhang Rang
 Step-brother: He Miao, courtesy name Shuda, born "Zhu Miao", an elder half-brother of Empress He born of the same mother. Thus, He Miao is actually not blood-related to He Jin. He served as General of Chariots and Cavalry, and was killed by He Jin's subordinate Wu Kuang and Dong Zhuo's brother Dong Min in late September 189 (after He Jin's death) for sympathizing with the eunuch faction who assassinated He Jin.

According to historical sources, it is widely believed that He Jin had at least one son, He Xian, who survived the downfall of the He family in 189, and who had a son, He Yan ( 196–249). As He Xian died early, his wife Lady Yin remarried and became a concubine of the warlord Cao Cao, who adopted He Yan. However, He Yan was buried at Lujiang when one's place of burial was customarily the ancestral home, which contradicts the fact that He Jin was from Nanyang; so He Yan was probably a grandson of He Miao, as Weilue suggests, while it was recorded that there had actually been several families of the Zhu clan, which might be the clan that He Miao was from, at Lujiang during Eastern Han.

See also
 Lists of people of the Three Kingdoms

References

 Chen, Shou (3rd century). Records of the Three Kingdoms (Sanguozhi).
 
 Fan, Ye (5th century). Book of the Later Han (Houhanshu).
 Pei, Songzhi (5th century). Annotations to Records of the Three Kingdoms (Sanguozhi zhu).

189 deaths
2nd-century births
2nd-century executions
2nd-century deaths
Executed Han dynasty people
Executed people from Henan
Han dynasty generals from Henan
People during the end of the Han dynasty
Han dynasty politicians from Henan
Mayors of Luoyang
People executed by the Han dynasty by decapitation
Politicians from Nanyang, Henan